John Simson Woolson (December 6, 1840 – December 4, 1899) was a United States district judge of the United States District Court for the Southern District of Iowa.

Education and career

Born in Tonawanda, New York, Woolson received an Artium Baccalaureus degree in 1860 and an Artium Magister degree in 1863 from Wesleyan University. Interrupting his legal education to serve in the American Civil War, he was an assistant paymaster in the United States Navy from 1862 to 1865 aboard the USS Housatonic (sunk by the submarine torpedo, H.L. Hunley) and the USS Monadnock. Following the war, he relocated to Iowa, where he read law to enter the bar in 1866. He was in private practice in Mt. Pleasant, Iowa from 1866 to 1891. While in practice, he served as a member of the Iowa Senate from 1876 to 1881, and from 1885 to 1891.

Federal judicial service

Woolson received a recess appointment from President Benjamin Harrison on August 14, 1891, to a seat on the United States District Court for the Southern District of Iowa vacated by Judge James M. Love. He was nominated to the same position by President Harrison on December 10, 1891. He was confirmed by the United States Senate on January 11, 1892, and received his commission the same day. His service terminated on December 4, 1899, due to his death in Des Moines, Iowa.

References

Sources

External links

1840 births
1899 deaths
Wesleyan University alumni
Iowa state senators
Judges of the United States District Court for the Southern District of Iowa
United States federal judges appointed by Benjamin Harrison
19th-century American judges
People from Tonawanda, New York
United States Navy officers
People from Mount Pleasant, Iowa
19th-century American politicians
United States federal judges admitted to the practice of law by reading law